Pueblo Viejo is a municipality (municipio) of the Azua province in the Dominican Republic.

History
The town that is now known as Pueblo Viejo was the place where in 1504 Diego Velázquez de Cuéllar, the conqueror of Cuba, founded the colonial town of Azua de Compostela. It was named in honour of one of the first Spanish settlers in the area, Don Pedro Gallego, a native of Santiago de Compostela, in Galicia, Spain. The first part of the name is derived from the local Native American name for the area. The old colonial city was destroyed by an earthquake on October the 16th 1751. The settlers of the area moved further North, near the River Road, and established a new town in that area.

References

External links 
 "Everton Earns its 50% Interest From GlobeStar Dominican Republic Project" - MarketWire
 "Barrick Gold’s Dominican mine says injuries not serious" - Dominican Today
 "Barrick Gold "benefits Dominican Republic", says executive" - Dominican Today
 "Goldcorp Keeps Shining" - MoneyShow
 "Toxins sickened Barrick Gold’s 326 Dominican miners, study says" - Dominican Today

Populated places in Azua Province
Municipalities of the Dominican Republic
Populated places established in 1504